Willow Walk may refer to 

 A former railway depot next to Bricklayers Arms railway station in South East London
 A path between Oxford and North Hinksey, continuing Ferry Hinksey Road